FC Smorgon is a Belarusian football club based in Smarhon. They will play in the Belarusian Premier League, the first level in the Belarusian league system, after being promoted from the Belarusian First League in 2021.

History 
1987: founded as FC Stankostroitel Smorgon
1993: renamed to FC Smorgon

Current squad 
As of March 2023

League and Cup history 

1 Including 6 games carried from the first round.

External links 
Official website 

Smorgon
1987 establishments in Belarus
Smarhon’
Association football clubs established in 1987